Gerard Kroone (1 February 1897 – 24 November 1979) was a Dutch chess player.

Biography
Gerard Kroone played for Netherlands in the Chess Olympiads:
 In 1927, at third board in the 1st Chess Olympiad in London (+8, =2, -5),
 In 1928, at second board in the 2nd Chess Olympiad in The Hague (+7, =4, -5).

Kroone is also known for playing three matches in 1919 and 1923 with the future World Chess Champion Max Euwe, the first of which ended in a 5-5 tie.

References

External links

Gerard Kroone chess games at 365chess.com

1897 births
1979 deaths
Sportspeople from Amsterdam
Dutch chess players
Chess Olympiad competitors
20th-century chess players